Michael Joseph Bradshaw is a British geographer. He is a former vice president of the Royal Geographical Society and professor of global energy at Warwick Business School.

Biography 
BSc from the University of Birmingham, his MA from the University of Calgary and his PhD at the University of British Columbia. His background is in human geography. Until January 2014, Bradshaw served as professor of human geography at the University of Leicester. Bradshaw serves as professor of global energy at Warwick Business School. He is a Fellow of the Royal Geographic Society and Academician of the Academy of Social Sciences. He was formerly vice president of the Royal Geographic Society. Bradshaw specializes in the geopolitical economy of global energy, on which he was written and taught widely.

Selected bibliography 
 Global energy dilemmas : energy security, globalization, and climate change, 2014
 Global energy : issues, potentials, and policy implications, 2015
 An introduction to human geography : 5th edition, 2016

References 

Academics of the University of Leicester
Academics of the University of Warwick
Alumni of the University of Birmingham
British geographers
Fellows of the Academy of Social Sciences
Fellows of the Royal Geographical Society
Living people
University of British Columbia alumni
University of Calgary alumni
Year of birth missing (living people)